, born June 27, 1993 as  is a Japanese professional sumo wrestler from Isahaya, Nagasaki. His highest rank is jūryō 9.

Early life
Masamitsu Umeno comes from a family originally from the island of Tsushima. His grandmother (Hideko Umeno) was the oldest ama diver in Tsushima. He first went to the Isahaya Agricultural High School before graduating from Nihon University where he was a member of their sumo club. During his time as a student, he suffered a meniscus injury to his left knee and to his anterior cruciate ligament at the All Japan University Sumo Uwajima Tournament on April 29, 2015. He aggravated his injury at the Individual Weight Category Championships and was unable to compete in subsequent competitions. His professional debut was postponed because of his torn anterior cruciate ligament in his left knee. He however joined professional sumo in 2016, entering the Sakaigawa stable because his master (former komusubi Ryōgoku) is also from his home prefecture. His stablemate Hiradoumi, who reached the top makuuchi division in September 2022, is also from Nagasaki.

Career
Wrestling under his real name of Umeno Masamitsu, he changed his shikona, or ring name, to Tsushimanada in 2017, to evoke 20th century ōzeki Tsushimanada Yakichi, who was originally from Tsushima Island like his family, and to whom he thought he was related to. However, after further investigation his master declared "it was not the case".While in makushita, in the final day of the May 2022 tournament, Tsushimanada defeated upper division wrestler and former komusubi Shōhōzan. This proved to be Shōhōzan's final match.
In September 2022, it was announced that he would be promoted to jūryō for the November 2022 tournament, hence being the fourth sekitori in his stable. His promotion also makes him the first wrestler from his hometown to be promoted sekitori in 45 years, since the retirement of former maegashira Shishihō Yoshimasa. However, Tsushimanada suffered a narrow loss in his first tournament as a sekitori, achieving a 7-8 make-kochi record. After his first tournament at sekitori, he visited his hometown of Isahaya for the first time in seven years, because he decided that he would not return until he became a sekitori. Tsushimanada maintained his sekitori rank due to the balance of promotion and demotion within the ranking. After a good performance during the 2023 January tournament, in which he scored five wins in a row during his last five matches, he was promoted to jūryō 9.

Career record

References

External links
 

1993 births
Living people
Japanese sumo wrestlers
Sumo people from Nagasaki Prefecture
Nihon University alumni